Phillip Rhee (born September 7, 1960) is an American martial artist, actor, director, screenwriter, and film producer, most famous for his role in the Best of the Best movie series.

Life and career
Rhee was born in South Korea and raised in San Francisco, California. He is a martial artist, actor, director and film producer who has created, produced and starred in numerous films, including the Best of the Best film series. The first Best of the Best film spawned three sequels; Best of the Best 2, Best of the Best 3: No Turning Back and Best of the Best 4: Without Warning.

Rhee's 1980 representation of the United States' Taekwondo Team against the South Korean team in the championships of the Asia Games formed the basis of his screenplay for the film Best of the Best.

Family
Philip's brother, Simon Rhee, is also a martial artist and actor; he co-starred in the Best of the Best films.

Philip Rhee married his wife, Amy, in 1990.

Filmography
 2017 Two Bellmen Three (short)
 2015 Underdog Kids — also director, producer and screenwriter
 1998 Best of the Best 4: Without Warning — also director, producer and screenwriter
 1995 Best of the Best 3: No Turning Back — also director and  producer
 1993 Best of the Best 2 — also producer
 1989 Best of the Best — also producer and storywriter
 1988 Silent Assassins
 1987 Hell Squad
 1986 L.A. Streetfighters
 1985 Crime Killer
 1984 Furious
 1983 Firefight (short)
 1977 The Kentucky Fried Movie Klahn's Guard (segment "A Fistful of Yen")

Personal life
He is trained in various martial arts such as Taekwondo (where he is a 6th dan black belt), Hapkido (where he is a 3rd dan black belt), Wing Chun and Boxing.

References

External links
 
 
 

1960 births
American film directors of Korean descent
American male film actors
American Wing Chun practitioners
American Jeet Kune Do practitioners
American wushu practitioners
American male taekwondo practitioners
American hapkido practitioners
Living people
American kendoka
American male actors of Korean descent